Presidential and vice presidential elections were held in South Korea on 5 August 1952. The result was a victory for Syngman Rhee, who won 74.6% of the vote. Voter turnout was 88.1%. The election was held during the Korean War, which played an important role in consolidating Rhee's support.

Background
President Rhee's factions took a devastating blow in the 1950 legislative election, when they won a little more than a quarter of the seats in the National Assembly, combined. In belief he would have little shot at reelection in the opposition-controlled legislature, President Rhee decided to amend the constitution so that the president would be elected by the people, instead of the legislature. President Rhee had the amendment pass in July 1952, after using police and military to threaten lawmakers.

Results

President

By region

Vice President

By region

References 

1952 elections in South Korea
Presidential elections in South Korea